Project MKCHICKWIT, or CHICKWIT was a covert program of the US Department of Defense operated in conjunction with the CIA. A partner program to MKSEARCH, the goal of MKCHICKWIT was to "identify new drug developments in Europe and Asia and to obtain information and samples".

See also
Project MKULTRA

References 

Central Intelligence Agency operations
American secret government programs
Mkchickwit